The Kettleman Hills is a low mountain range of the interior California Coast Ranges, in western Kings County, California. It is a northwest–southeast trending line of hills about 30 miles long which parallels the San Andreas Fault to the west.

The Kettleman Hills are named (though misspelled) after Dave Kettelman, a pioneer sheep and cattle rancher who grazed his animals there in the 1860s. They are the location of the Kettleman North Dome Oil Field.

References 

California Coast Ranges
Mountain ranges of Northern California
Mountain ranges of Kings County, California
Geography of the San Joaquin Valley